This list is a summary of notable electric battery types composed of one or more electrochemical cells. Three lists are provided in the table.  The primary (non-rechargeable) and secondary (rechargeable) cell lists are lists of battery chemistry.  The third list is a list of battery applications.

Battery cell types

See also 

 Baghdad Battery
 Battery nomenclature
 Carnot battery
 Comparison of commercial battery types
 History of the battery
 List of battery sizes
 List of energy densities
 Search for the Super Battery (2017 PBS film)
 Fuel cell

References 

 
Battery